La República (Spanish for "The Republic") may refer to:

 La República (Peru), a Peruvian newspaper based in Lima
 La República (Uruguay), a Uruguayan newspaper based in Montevideo
 Colegio La República, a Chilean high school located in Rancagua

See also
 la Repubblica, an Italian newspaper based in Rome
 Republica (disambiguation)